Johan Albrecht With (1683–1754) was a Danish military officer and governor. He served as the County Governor of several counties in Norway and Denmark.

He began studying at the University in 1698, and after some time, he then enlisted in the military in 1710 and was a lieutenant in the Danish cavalry. By 1719, he had advanced to the rank of lieutenant colonel in Jutland's National Cavalry Regiment. In 1721, he left the military and the following year he got a job as a translator at the Øresund customs office.

King Christian VI of Denmark appointed him in 1730 to serve in Norway as the Diocesan Governor of Christianssand stiftamt (and simultaneously as the County Governor of Nedenæs amt). In 1738, he resigned and moved to Nyborg where he bought a couple of farms. In 1746, he was appointed to be the Diocesan Governor of Viborg stiftamt (and also served as the County Governor of Hald amt at the same time). In 1747, he received the Order of the Dannebrog. He died on 6 August 1754 in Viborg.

References

1683 births
1754 deaths
County governors of Norway